Gaviphosa is a monotypic genus of south Asian ground spiders containing the single species, Gaviphosa kera. It was first described by P. M. Sankaran and J. T. D. Caleb in 2021, and it has only been found in India.

See also
 List of Gnaphosidae species

References

Monotypic Gnaphosidae genera
Spiders of the Indian subcontinent